Echidna leucotaenia, the whiteface moray, also known as the white-banded moray eel, is a moray eel (family Muraenidae). It was described by Schultz in 1943. It is a tropical, marine and freshwater eel which is known from the Indo-Pacific, including East Africa, the Line Islands, the Tuamotu Islands, and Johnston Island.

The whiteface moray's diet consists primarily of crabs.

References

leucotaenia
Fish described in 1943
Taxa named by Leonard Peter Schultz